In the 2016–17 season, MO Béjaïa is competing in the Ligue 1 for the 4th season, as well as the Algerian Cup. It is their 4th consecutive season in the top flight of Algerian football. They will be competing in Ligue 1, the Algerian Cup and the Confederation Cup.

Squad list
Players and squad numbers last updated on 19 August 2016.Note: Flags indicate national team as has been defined under FIFA eligibility rules. Players may hold more than one non-FIFA nationality.

Competitions

Overview

Ligue 1

League table

Results summary

Results by round

Matches

Algerian Cup

Confederation Cup

group stage

Semi-finals

Final

Squad information

Playing statistics

|-
! colspan=14 style=background:#dcdcdc; text-align:center| Goalkeepers

|-
! colspan=14 style=background:#dcdcdc; text-align:center| Defenders

|-
! colspan=14 style=background:#dcdcdc; text-align:center| Midfielders

|-
! colspan=14 style=background:#dcdcdc; text-align:center| Forwards

|-
! colspan=14 style=background:#dcdcdc; text-align:center| Players transferred out during the season

Goalscorers
Includes all competitive matches. The list is sorted alphabetically by surname when total goals are equal.

Squad list
As of 15 January 2017.

Transfers

In

Out

Notes

References

2016-17
Algerian football clubs 2016–17 season